Albion railway station is located on the Sunbury line in Victoria, Australia. It serves the western Melbourne suburb of Albion, and it opened on 5 January 1860 as Albion and Darlington. It closed on 1 January 1861, and reopened on 24 March 1891 as Albion.

The Melbourne – Sydney standard gauge line passes to the east of the station and, along with the Albion – Jacana freight line, branches off north of the station.

History

The Melbourne & Murray River Railway (now the Bendigo line) opened in 1859, operating from Footscray to Sunbury. By the early 1860s, the line had been extended to Bendigo. A station named Albion and Darlington was built on the site of the current station, opening on 5 January 1860. Albion and Darlington only remained open for a single year. In 1891, a new station, named Albion, opened to the west of the previous station. In 1919, Albion relocated to its current site.

In 1961, the former Ballarat Road level crossing was grade separated, and was replaced with a road overpass over the railway line, just north of the station.

Until 1961, the station had a signal box for the control of the junction with the Albion – Jacana freight line, after which it was replaced by a signal panel, which was moved to the Sunshine signal box in 1965. In 1972, both platforms received extensions. In 2022, both platforms were extended at the Up end.

As part of the Melbourne Airport rail link project, Albion is scheduled to be rebuilt. An 18-metre high flyover will also be built above Albion and Ballarat Road.

Platforms and services

Albion has one island platform with two faces. It is serviced by Metro Trains' Sunbury line services.

Platform 1:
  all stations and limited express services to Flinders Street

Platform 2:
  all stations services to Watergardens and Sunbury

By late 2025, it is planned that trains on the Sunbury line will be through-routed with those on the Pakenham and Cranbourne lines, via the new Metro Tunnel.

Transport links

Kinetic Melbourne operates two routes via Albion station, under contract to Public Transport Victoria:
 : Caroline Springs – Highpoint Shopping Centre
 : Caroline Springs – Sunshine station

Transit Systems Victoria operates one route via Albion station, under contract to Public Transport Victoria:
 : Sunshine station – Woodgrove Shopping Centre (Melton)

Gallery

References

External links
 
 Melway map at street-directory.com.au

Railway stations in Melbourne
Railway stations in Australia opened in 1860
Railway stations in the City of Brimbank